Gilbert Lee Mains (December 17, 1929 – January 10, 2009) was an American football defensive tackle for the Detroit Lions (1953–1961). He attended Murray State University. Gil Mains performed as a pro wrestler during the off-season in the late 1950s and early 1960s, wrestling such stars as Lou Thesz and other Detroit area grapplers. Gil was involved in a variety of business ventures in the South Michigan, Northern Ohio areas since his retirement from the Lions, most notably RMF Global and Great Lakes Industrial.  He was born in Mount Carmel, Illinois.

Mains died in January 2009.

References

External links

1929 births
2009 deaths
People from Mount Carmel, Illinois
American football defensive linemen
Detroit Lions players
Murray State Racers football players
Professional wrestlers from Illinois